Mark Knowles and Daniel Nestor were the defending champions but did not compete that year.

Jacco Eltingh and Paul Haarhuis won in the final 6–3, 6–2 against Patrik Fredriksson and Magnus Norman.

Seeds

  Jacco Eltingh /  Paul Haarhuis (champions)
  Peter Nyborg /  Libor Pimek (first round)
  Guillaume Raoux /  Javier Sánchez (first round)
  Hendrik Jan Davids /  Sjeng Schalken (quarterfinals)

Draw

References
 1997 Qatar Open Doubles Draw

1997 Qatar Open
1997 ATP Tour
Qatar Open (tennis)